The Heiresses is a 1980 Hungarian drama film directed by Márta Mészáros and starring Isabelle Huppert. It was entered into the 1980 Cannes Film Festival.

Cast
 Isabelle Huppert - Irène
 Erzsébet Kútvölgyi - Iréne (voice)
 Lili Monori - Szilvia
 Jan Nowicki - Ákos
 Sándor Oszter - Ákos (voice)
 Juci Komlós - Teréz (voice)
 Zita Perczel - Teréz
 Sándor Szabó - Komáromi
 Zsolt Körtvélyessy
 Witold Holtz
 Éva Gyulányi
 Zoltán Jancsó
 Piotr Skrzynecki - Fülöp bácsi (as Piotr Skrzinecki)
 Kati Sír
 Károly Mécs

See also
 Isabelle Huppert on screen and stage

References

External links

1980 films
1980s Hungarian-language films
1980 drama films
Films directed by Márta Mészáros
Hungarian drama films